Molecular Neurodegeneration is a peer-reviewed scientific journal covering research on the molecular mechanisms underlying neurodegeneration, especially as pertaining to neurodegenerative diseases. The journal was established in 2006 and is published by BioMed Central. The editors-in-chief are Guojun Bu (Mayo Clinic) and Huaxi Xu (Sanford-Burnham Medical Research Institute). It is the official journal of the BrightFocus Foundation.

Abstracting and indexing 
The journal is abstracted and indexed in:

According to the Journal Citation Reports, the journal has a 2021 impact factor of 18.879.

References

External links 
 

Neuroscience journals
Neurology journals
Creative Commons-licensed journals
Publications established in 2006
English-language journals
BioMed Central academic journals